Cut Foot Sioux may refer to:

Cut Foot Sioux Lake, a lake in Minnesota
Cut Foot Sioux Trail, a trail in Minnesota